Christ Church, Newark is a parish church in the Church of England in Newark-on-Trent, Nottinghamshire.

History
The church was built in 1836 to 1837 by the architect J. D. Paine. It was evangelical in foundation, and the patronage was under the Church Pastoral Aid Society.

As Newark expanded, a new church was built to replace it in 1956 at the junction of Boundary Road and Holden Crescent. It was consecrated by the Bishop of Southwell in 1958.

Organ
The church has a two-manual organ by Cousins of Lincoln. A specification of the organ can be found on the National Pipe Organ Register.

List of organists
James Harston 1890 - ca. 1912 (formerly organist of St. Wilfrid's Church, South Muskham).

Sources

Newark on Trent
Churches completed in 1837
20th-century Church of England church buildings
Churches completed in 1956
Newark-on-Trent